The 2001 IIFA Awards, officially known as the 2nd International Indian Film Academy Awards  ceremony, presented by the International Indian Film Academy honoured the best films of 2000 and took place between June 16, 2001. This year, the city of Sun City played host to the Indian Film Industry. 

The official ceremony took place on June 16, 2001, at the Sun City, in Super Bowl Arena Sun City . During the ceremony, IIFA Awards were awarded in 27 competitive categories. 

Reflective of its guiding philosophy, the venue for IIFA 2001 was the splendorous Sun City in South Africa. The hype gained intensity, as performers descended on Sun City. The Indian stars were welcomed by thousands of fans and traditional African dancers. Film enthusiasts swarmed the Sun City. The first ever IIFA World Premiere was held. The film – Lagaan, which went on to win a nomination at the Oscars for the Best Foreign Language Film. An exclusive session with the media at a special Press Meet post show discussed the increasing awareness about Indian Cinema on a global platform. Sun City outshone the sun itself on show day. The venue sparkled as the red carpet awaited its brightest stars. The crowd stirred as limousines rolled in. And the television cameras zoomed in. The hosts for the evening, Miss World Priyanka Chopra and the dashing Kabir Bedi, welcomed the guests. The dances from African Footprint set the rhythm of excitement for the night.

Dhadkan, Kaho Naa... Pyaar Hai and Mohabbatein led the ceremony with 12 nominations each, followed by Fiza,  Mission Kashmir and Refugee with 7 nominations each.

Kaho Naa... Pyaar Hai won 10 awards, including Best Film, Best Director (for Rakesh Roshan) and Best Actor (for Hrithik Roshan), thus becoming the most-awarded film at the ceremony.

Awards 

The winners and nominees have been listed below. Winners are listed first, highlighted in boldface, and indicated with a double dagger.

Popular Awards

Technical Awards

Special Awards

Superlatives

References

External links
 The International Indian Film Academy Awards (2001) at the Internet Movie Database

Iifa Awards
IIFA awards